Video High Density (VHD) is an analog videodisc format which was marketed predominantly in Japan by JVC. There was also a digital audio-only variant, Audio High Density (AHD; not released/canceled).

Technology 

Each disc is stored in a caddy—like the CED system from RCA, also known as SelectaVision VideoDisc, the user never handled the disc directly. The entire caddy is inserted into the player, and then withdrawn, leaving the disc inside where it will be loaded and start playing. At the end of the side the disc must be removed, turned over and re-inserted.

Like the RCA system, the signal is recorded on the discs as variations in capacitance, a conductive coating on the disc itself forming part of a resonant circuit. A diamond stylus reads the signal, though unlike CED there are no actual grooves—the stylus follows the tracks electronically, like a compact disc. This means less wear, though there is still physical contact (unlike LaserDisc) so some wear would still occur.

The discs contain two frames (four fields) per revolution, and play in CAV mode, which makes play simple, as all frames start at the same place on the disc, but having two frames per rotation means that true freeze frame is not possible — there would be some "jitter" on moving sequences (discs which were designed to be used a frame at a time - such as picture catalogues - doubled up the frames, to get true stills at the cost of reduced capacity).

The VHD system had advantages over both the RCA Capacitance Electronic Disc system and the MCA/Philips LaserVision system.  In active (CAV) mode (not available in CED) it had a greater capacity than LaserVision. It also had the ability to carry 99 randomly accessible 'chapters' (more than LaserVision) and had the same autostop capability. These two functions had to be programmed into the master tape from which the videodisc was made, along with the two-frame freeze frame function. This made videotape master editing a highly specialist operation requiring precise insertion of vertical interval codes into the video signal, and field accurate editing (most videotape editing required only frame accuracy).

VHD was always intended as a highly interactive format, and many non-linear 'trick-play' features were supported, directly by the players or via an optional VHDpc computer interface for the MSX and Sharp X1 computers. 

Applications included interactive adventure games, and car engine diagnostic tools. Constructing an interactive disc required a lot of planning as well as the specialist video master editing. The costs entailed in discovering these complexities and solving the problems, as well as recognising that the video post-production technology of the time was being pushed to its limits probably contributed to the decision to withdraw the system.

History 

VHD was first demonstrated in 1978, and after numerous advertisements in 1981/1982 National Geographic magazines, it was eventually released in Japan on April 21st, 1983. By this time, both LaserDisc and CED were already suffering from the onslaught of VHS and Betamax VCRs. Despite demonstrating the player at several Consumer Electronics Shows, JVC opted not to release VHD as a consumer product in North America.

In the UK Thorn EMI, which was the leading consumer provider of the VHS tape system, saw VHD as the next step in the market and committed to the system. In 1981 it invested in a factory to press discs (in Swindon) and a production unit to develop a catalogue of "interactive" titles—a unique step—to support a planned 1984 launch but canceled the investment in late 1983. VHD remained on the market in the UK primarily as an educational and training tool, usually linked to a computer, but attracted few customers.

It found its main niche as a karaoke system, and was also used in anime video games and interactive training systems. Commercial versions were available in the UK (and probably the US) for training, demonstration and fault diagnosis.

A stereoscopic system was also sold in Japan; these 3D VHD systems achieved the 3D effect using double-speed discs with alternate-eye images and LCS glasses to pass the correct view to each eye.

VHD became obsolete after 1987. Discs continued to be manufactured up until the early 1990s. The last new release on the format was in late 1990.

See also 
 Capacitance Electronic Disc

References

External links 
 Total Rewind—The Virtual Museum of Vintage Video
 VHD DiscWorld
 The LaserDisc Database—LD/CED/VHD discs, profiling and marketplace

Audiovisual introductions in 1983
Japanese inventions
Video storage